Cornelius J. Leahy was a Private in the United States Army who received the Medal of Honor for actions during the Philippine–American War.

He is buried in San Francisco National Cemetery, San Francisco, California.

Medal of Honor citation
Rank and organization: Private, Company A, 36th Infantry, U.S. Volunteers. Place and date: Near Porac, Luzon, Philippine Islands, September 3, 1899. Entered service at: San Francisco, Calif. Birth: Ireland. Date of issue: May 3, 1902.

Citation:

Distinguished gallantry in action in driving off a superior force and with the assistance of 1 comrade brought from the field of action the bodies of 2 comrades, 1 killed and the other severely wounded, this while on a scout.

See also

List of Medal of Honor recipients
List of Philippine–American War Medal of Honor recipients

Notes

References

1872 births
1900 deaths
19th-century Irish people
Irish soldiers in the United States Army
United States Army Medal of Honor recipients
Irish emigrants to the United States (before 1923)
United States Army soldiers
American military personnel of the Philippine–American War
Irish-born Medal of Honor recipients
Philippine–American War recipients of the Medal of Honor
Burials at San Francisco National Cemetery